Two ships and two establishments of the Royal Navy have been named HMS Impregnable:

Ships
  was a 98-gun second rate. This ship of the line was launched in 1786 and wrecked in 1799.
  was an 104-gun first rate launched in 1810. She became a school ship in 1862, was renamed HMS Kent in 1888, HMS Caledonia in 1891, and was sold in 1906.

Training establishment
  was a training establishment started at Devonport in 1862, and active until 1929. As training ships were replaced or added to the establishment, each was renamed Impregnable when she took on the role:
  was the original school ship between 1862 and 1888.
  was HMS Impregnable between 1885 and 1911, and HMS Impregnable I between 1911 and 1919.
  was HMS Impregnable between 1919 and 1929.
  was HMS Impregnable II between 1911 and 1919, and HMS Impregnable (Old) between 1919 and 1922.
  was HMS Impregnable II between 1919 and 1931.
  was HMS Impregnable III between 1910 and 1922.
  was HMS Impregnable III between 1922 and 1929.
  was HMS Impregnable IV between 1915 and 1922.
  was HMS Impregnable IV between 1919 and 1929.
  was a training establishment for 'hostilities only' communications ratings at Plymouth between 1935 and 1947. After decommissioning HMS Impregnable was reopened soon after, remaining in commission until 1948.

References

Royal Navy ship names